The Zulia toad-headed sideneck (Mesoclemmys zuliae), also known commonly as the Zulia toad-headed turtle, is a species of turtle in the family Chelidae. The species is endemic to Venezuela.

Etymology
The specific name, zuliae, refers to the Venezuelan state of Zulia.

Geographic range
The type locality of M. zuliae is Cano Madre Vieja near El Guayabo, Distrito Colón, Zulia, Venezuela.

Habitat
The preferred natural habitat of M. zuliae is freshwater inland bodies of water.

References

Further reading
Bour R, Zaher H (2005). "A new species of Mesoclemmys, from the open formations of northeastern Brazil (Chelonii, Chelidae)". Papéis Avulsos de Zoologia da Universidade de São Paulo 45 (24): 295–311. (Mesoclemmys zuliae, new combination). (in English, with an abstract in Portuguese).
Rojas-Runjaic FJM (2009). "Mesoclemmys zuliae – Die geheimnisvolle Krötenkopfschildkröte aus dem Süden des Maracaibo-Sees ". Reptilia, Münster 14 (80): 34–39. (in German).
Vargas-Ramírez M, Michaels J, Castaño-Mora OV, Cárdenas-Arevalo G (2012). "Weak genetic divergence between the two South American toad-headed turtles Mesoclemmys dahli and M. zuliae (Testudines: Pleurodira: Chelidae)". Amphibia-Reptilia 33 (3/4): 373–385.

zuliae
Turtles of South America
Reptiles of Venezuela
Endemic fauna of Venezuela
Reptiles described in 1984
Taxonomy articles created by Polbot